This is a list of radio stations in Estonia.

Eesti Rahvusringhääling
Vikerraadio (The station was launched in 1967)
Raadio 2 (The station was launched in 1993)
Klassikaraadio (The station was launched in 1995) (FM in Estonia and DAB+ in Tallinn, Pehka and Koeru)
Raadio 4 (Russian language station. The station was launched in 1993)
Raadio Tallinn (radio station in Tallinn. With retranslations BBC World Service and RFI Monde. The station was launched in 2006.)

Postimees Grupp (Duo Media Networks)
Radio Kuku (The station was launched in 1992) (FM in Estonia and DAB+ in Tallinn, Pehka and Koeru)
Radio Elmar (The station was launched in 1997) (FM in Estonia and DAB+ in Tallinn, Pehka and Koeru)
Radio Duo (The station was launched in 2022) (FM in Viljandi, Rapla and Tartu, DAB+ in Tallinn, Pehka and Koeru)
MyHits (launched in 2016) (FM in Estonia and DAB+ in Tallinn, Pehka and Koeru)
Narodnoe radio (Russian language station) (FM in Tallinn, Kohtla-Jarve and Narva, DAB+ in Tallinn, Pehka and Koeru)
DFM Eesti (Russian-language station) (FM in Tallinn and Narva, DAB+ in Tallinn, Pehka and Koeru)

TV3 Group
Star FM
Star FM Eesti (88.5 FM in Rakvere, 94.8 FM in Võru, 95.8 FM in Jõgeva, 103.8 FM in Haapsalu, DAB+ in Tallinn, Pehka and Koeru)
Power Hit Radio (FM in Estonia and DAB+ in Tallinn, Pehka and Koeru)
Radio Volna (Russian-language station in Tallinn, Kohtla-Nõmme and Narva)

Sky Media Group
Sky Plus
Retro FM (launched in 2005)
Rock FM (launched in 2017 in Tallinn, Tartu, Pärnu, Viljandi, Narva, Haapsalu)
NRJ Estonia (Tallinn)
Russkoye Radio (in Russian language in Tallinn, Rakvere, Kohtla-Jarve, Narva and Tartu)
SKY Radio (in Russian language in Tallinn, Rakvere, Kohtla-Jarve, Narva and Tartu)

Tre Raadio Network
Tre Raadio (FM-network in Estonia, DAB+ in Tallinn, Pehka and Koeru)
Ring FM (Viljandi 93.7 FM, Tartu 104.7 FM and Võru 101.7 FM)
Ruut FM (Valga 96.6 FM)

Pereraadio network
Pereraadio (89.6 FM in Tallinn, 89.0 FM in Tartu and Kuressaare, 88.9 FM in Rakvere, 88.7 FM in Valga and Kärdla, 88.2 FM in Ida-Virumaa, 89.4 FM in Haapsalu, 95,7 FM in Võru)
Semeinoje Radio Eli (95.6 FM in Narva, 98.2 FM in Kohtla-Järve, 1035 AM in Tartu)

Other radio networks
Äripäeva Raadio (FM in Tallinn, Tartu, Pärnu, Kohtla-Nõmme, Haapsalu and Kuressaare, DAB+ in Tallinn, Pehka and Koeru)
Relax FM (Tallinn, Tartu, Pärnu, Narva and Saaremaa)
Raadio 7 (Tallinn, Tamsalu, Parnu and Tartu)
Yumor FM (in Russian language in Tallinn, Kohtla-Nõmme, Narva and Tartu)

Regional radio stations
SSS-Radio (Finnish-language station in Tallinn)
Nõmme Raadio (Tallinn)
Raadio Kadi (Saaremaa and Hiiumaa)
Kaguraadio (Põlva)

Unsorted
Landessender Reval (during WW II)
Radio Tallinn
Radio Tartu (Tartu Radio)

References

Radio stations
Estonia